Schizodon borellii is a fish in the family Anostomidae from South America.

The fish is named in honor of zoologist Alfonso Borelli (1857-1943), Università di Torino. Borelli led three expeditions into the interior of South America and collected the type specimen of this species along with many other animals.

Description
Schizodon borellii can grow to  standard length.

Distribution
It is found in the Paraguay River basin in Argentina and Brazil.

References

Anostomidae
Freshwater fish of Argentina
Freshwater fish of Brazil
Taxa named by George Albert Boulenger
Fish described in 1900